"Alibi" is a song recorded by Serbian pop recording artist Milica Pavlović featuring rapper Nesh which served as the fourth single from her debut studio album Govor tela. The video and song were originally planned to premiere on the 22 December 2013 episode of the television show Narod pita, but the release was delayed until 2 January 2014. The lyrics were written by Vuksan Bilanović, with music by Atelje Trag.

The music video was filmed in December 2013 at a cost of €20,000. It premiered the same day as the song.

References

2014 singles
2014 songs
Grand Production singles